"Baby, I'm Jealous" is a song by American singer Bebe Rexha featuring American rapper and singer Doja Cat, from Rexha's second studio album Better Mistakes. It was released as the lead single from the album on October 9, 2020. A remix featuring Dominican singer Natti Natasha was released on November 27, 2020.

Background
On September 23, 2020, the song was registered on Shazam and was said to be a collaboration with Doja Cat. On October 4, Apple Music showed that the song would release on October 9. Rexha later posted on social media that she would make a "special announcement". The next day, she announced the release with the cover and link to pre-save the single.

Music video
A accompanying music video for the song was shot in September 2020. The song's video was directed by Hannah Lux Davis and includes cameos from social media personalities Nikita Dragun, Charli D'Amelio and Avani Gregg. It was released on the same day as the song.

Live performances
The song was first performed by Bebe Rexha and Doja Cat on The Tonight Show Starring Jimmy Fallon on October 19, 2020. Bebe also performed a solo version of the song on November 26, 2020, at the 94th Annual Macy's Thanksgiving Day Parade. She performed the song with Doja Cat on November 22 at the 2020 American Music Awards.

Credits and personnel
Credits adapted from Tidal and YouTube.

Personnel
 Bebe Rexha — main artist, lead vocals, writer
 Doja Cat — featured artist, vocals, writer
 Jason Gill — producer, writer
 Jussifer — producer, writer
 Justin Tranter — writer
 Pablo Bowman — writer
 Jaycen Joshua — mixing
 Colin Leonard — mastering

Charts

Certifications

Release history

References

2020 singles
2020 songs
Bebe Rexha songs
Doja Cat songs
Music videos directed by Hannah Lux Davis
Songs written by Bebe Rexha
Songs written by Doja Cat
Songs written by Jason Gill (musician)
Songs written by Jussifer
Songs written by Justin Tranter
Songs written by Pablo Bowman
Warner Records singles